The  and the later  are commuter electric multiple unit train types operated by Nagoya Railroad (Meitetsu) in Japan since 1993.

Liveries
All 3100, 3500, and 3700 series trainsets bore the Meitetsu all-red livery from new. From 5 June 2019, 3100 series sets were repainted to a red-and-white livery matching that of the 2200 series, starting with set 3107, as the two train types frequently operate in multiple with each other.

Refurbishment 
From fiscal 2017, 3500 series sets have undergone a programme of refurbishment. The work includes the installation of new traction equipment, full-color LED destination indicators, door chimes, and LCD passenger information displays. The first set to be treated, 3501, underwent test operation in August 2017. Set 3511 was fitted with updated equipment some time prior to the refurbishment programme, but the equipment used in the aforementioned set differs slightly from that used in sets refurbished from 2017.

References

Electric multiple units of Japan
3500 series
Train-related introductions in 1993

Nippon Sharyo multiple units
1500 V DC multiple units of Japan